The Signet 20 is a British trailerable sailboat that was designed by Ray Kaufmann as day sailer and pocket cruiser and first built in 1960.

Production
The design was built by Hurley Marine and Gilmax Limited in the United Kingdom and by Signet Marine in the United States, starting in 1960, but it is now out of production.

Design
The Signet 20 is a recreational keelboat, built predominantly of glassfibre, with wood trim. It has a masthead sloop rig; a spooned, raked stem and an angled transom. It displaces  and carries  of iron ballast.

The design was produced with a number of keel and rudder configurations, including a single fin keel, twin bilge keels, skeg-mounted rudders or transom-mounted rudders, all controlled by a tiller.

The boat is normally fitted with a small  outboard motor or an inboard engine for docking and maneuvering.

The design has sleeping accommodation for four people, with a double "V"-berth in the bow cabin and two straight quarter berths aft. The galley is located on the both sides just forward of the companionway ladder. The galley is equipped with a stove to starboard sink to port. The head is located in the bow cabin under the "V"-berth and is separated from the main cabin by a curtain.

Operational history
The boat is supported by an active class club that organizes racing events, the Hurley Owners Association.

See also
List of sailing boat types

References

Keelboats
1960s sailboat type designs
Sailing yachts 
Trailer sailers
Sailboat type designs by Ray Kaufmann
Sailboat types built by Gilmax Limited
Sailboat types built by Hurley Marine
Sailboat types built by Signet Marine